Sikar Bus Depot is the inter-district bus terminal of Sikar city. It is located along with Jaipur road in Sikar. It is Central Bus stand for Rajasthan State Road Transport Corporation. Buses are available for Jaipur, Alwar, Tonk, Jhunjhunu, Churu, Bikaner, Delhi, Haryana, Punjab, Uttarakhand, Gujarat and various other locations.

References

External links
 RSRTC Official web page

Sikar
Bus stations in Rajasthan
Transport in Rajasthan
Parking facilities in India